The following is a list of state highways in Kentucky with numbers between 1000 and 1999.

1000–1099

 KY 1058 (Russell)
 KY 1059 (Scott)
 KY 1060 (Spencer)
 KY 1061 (Taylor)
 KY 1062 (Trigg)
 KY 1063 (Webster)
 KY 1064 (Whitley)
 KY 1065 (Jefferson)
 KY 1066 (Nelson and Spencer)
 KY 1067 (Perry)
 KY 1068 (Lewis)
 KY 1069 (Hopkins and Webster)
 KY 1070 (Hickman)
 KY 1071 (Jackson and Owsley)
 KY 1072 (Kenton)
 KY 1073 (Breckinridge)
 KY 1074 (Hopkins)
 KY 1075 (Edmonson)
 KY 1076 (Clinton)
 KY 1077 (Caldwell and Crittenden)
 KY 1078 (Henderson)
 KY 1079 (Green, Hart, and LaRue)
 KY 1080 (McLean)
 KY 1081 (Magoffin and Morgan)
 KY 1082 (Greenup)
 KY 1083 (Butler and Warren)
 KY 1084 (Harlan)
 KY 1085 (Webster, deleted 1991)
 KY 1086 (Floyd)
 KY 1087 (Knott and Perry)
 KY 1088 (Knott and Perry)
 KY 1089 (Hopkins)
 KY 1090 (Magoffin)
 KY 1091 (Floyd and Knott)
 KY 1092 (Johnson)
 KY 1093 (Greenup)
 KY 1094 (Breathitt and Wolfe)
 KY 1095 (Perry)
 KY 1096 (Perry)
 KY 1097 (Lyon)
 KY 1098 (Breathitt and Knott)
 KY 1099 (Fulton)

1100–1199
 KY 1100 (Floyd and Johnson)
 KY 1101 (Floyd)
 KY 1102 (Knott)
 KY 1103 (Letcher)
 KY 1104 (Adair)
 KY 1105 (Ballard)
 KY 1106 (Bath)
 KY 1107 (Johnson)
 KY 1108 (Boyle)
 KY 1109 (Bracken)
 KY 1110 (Breathitt)
 KY 1111 (Breathitt, deleted 1996)
 KY 1112 (Carroll)
 KY 1113 (Lyon)
 KY 1114 (Breathitt)
 KY 1115 (Harlan)
 KY 1116 (Bullitt and Jefferson)
 KY 1117 (Butler)
 KY 1118 (Butler and Ohio)
 KY 1119 (Caldwell)
 KY 1120 (Campbell and Kenton)
 KY 1121 (Campbell)
 KY 1122 (Carter and Elliott)
 KY 1123 (Fleming)
 KY 1124 (Graves)
 KY 1125 (Fulton)
 KY 1126 (Fulton)
 KY 1127 (Fulton)
 KY 1128 (Fulton)
 KY 1129 (Fulton)
 KY 1130 (Gallatin)
KY 1130 Spur (Gallatin)
 KY 1131 (Garrard)
 KY 1132 (Grant)
 KY 1133 (Grayson)
 KY 1134 (Boyd)
 KY 1135 (Hardin)
 KY 1136 (Hardin)
 KY 1137 (Harlan)
 KY 1138 (Harlan)
 KY 1139 (Estill)
 KY 1140 (Hart)
 KY 1141 (Hart)
 KY 1142 (Jefferson)
 KY 1143 (Scott)
 KY 1144 (Lee)
 KY 1145 (Johnson)
 KY 1146 (Perry)
 KY 1147 (Allen)
 KY 1148 (Letcher)
 KY 1149 (Carter and Lewis)
 KY 1150 (Garrard and Lincoln)
 KY 1151 (Logan)
 KY 1152 (Rockcastle)
 KY 1153 (Butler and Logan)
 KY 1154 (McCracken)
 KY 1155 (McLean)
 KY 1156 (Madison)
 KY 1157 (Marion)
 KY 1158 (Meade)
 KY 1159 (Bracken)
 KY 1160 (Mercer)
 KY 1161 (Morgan)
 KY 1162 (Morgan)
 KY 1163 (Muhlenberg)
 KY 1164 (Ohio)
 KY 1165 (Perry)
 KY 1166 (Perry)
 KY 1167 (Rowan)
 KY 1168 (Grayson)
 KY 1169 (Spencer)
 KY 1170 (Simpson)
 KY 1171 (Simpson)
 KY 1172 (Greenup)
 KY 1173 (Carlisle)
 KY 1174 (Boyd)
 KY 1175 (Trigg)
 KY 1176 (Union)
 KY 1177 (Union)
 KY 1178 (Hopkins)
 KY 1179 (Union)
 KY 1180 (Union)
 KY 1181 (Carlisle)
 KY 1182 (Estill)
 KY 1183 (Marion and Washington)
 KY 1184 (Powell)
 KY 1185 (Lawrence)
 KY 1186 (Ballard)
 KY 1187 (Butler)
 KY 1188 (Gallatin, deleted 2007)
 KY 1189 (Laurel)
 KY 1190 (Morgan, deleted 2007)
 KY 1191 (Webster)
 KY 1192 (LaRue)
 KY 1193 (Laurel and Whitley)
 KY 1194 (Lincoln)
 KY 1195 (Marion and Washington)
 KY 1196 (Menifee)
 KY 1197 (Owen, deleted 2012)
 KY 1198 (Bath, Bourbon, and Nicholas)
 KY 1199 (Lyon)

1200–1299
 KY 1200 (Fleming)
 KY 1201 (McCracken)
 KY 1202 (Breathitt)
 KY 1203 (Carlisle)
 KY 1204 (Carroll)
 KY 1205 (Cumberland)
 KY 1206 (Cumberland)
 KY 1207 (Daviess)
 KY 1208 (Elliott)
 KY 1209 (Estill, Jackson, and Lee)
 KY 1210 (Floyd)
 KY 1211 (Franklin)
 KY 1212 (Fulton)
 KY 1213 (Graves)
 KY 1214 (Grayson and Hart)
 KY 1215 (Hopkins)
 KY 1216 (Harlan)
 KY 1217 (Henderson)
 KY 1218 (Hickman)
 KY 1219 (Hickman)
 KY 1220 (Hopkins)
 KY 1221 (Hopkins)
 KY 1222 (Scott)
 KY 1223 (Laurel)
 KY 1224 (Martin)
 KY 1225 (Pulaski)
 KY 1226 (Carroll and Trimble)
 KY 1227 (Laurel)
 KY 1228 (Laurel)
 KY 1229 (Rockcastle)
 KY 1230 (Jefferson)
 KY 1231 (Knott)
 KY 1232 (Knox)
 KY 1233 (McLean)
 KY 1234 (Mason)
 KY 1235 (Mason)
 KY 1236 (Mason)
 KY 1237 (Lewis and Mason)
 KY 1238 (Breckinridge and Meade)
 KY 1239 (Meade)
 KY 1240 (Menifee)
 KY 1241 (Graves and McCracken)
 KY 1242 (Menifee)
 KY 1243 (Metcalfe)
 KY 1244 (Nicholas)
 KY 1245 (Ohio)
 KY 1246 (Hopkins)
 KY 1247 (Lincoln and Pulaski)
 KY 1248 (Pulaski)
 KY 1249 (Rockcastle)
 KY 1250 (Rockcastle)
 KY 1251 (Spencer)
 KY 1252 (Taylor)
 KY 1253 (Trigg)
 KY 1254 (Harlan)
 KY 1255 (McCracken)
 KY 1256 (Trimble)
 KY 1257 (Union)
 KY 1258 (Wayne)
 KY 1259 (Whitley)
 KY 1260 (Morgan)
 KY 1261 (Wolfe)
 KY 1262 (Franklin)
 KY 1263 (Franklin)
 KY 1264 (Grayson, deleted 1995)
 KY 1265 (Hancock)
 KY 1266 (Clinton)
 KY 1267 (Fayette, Jessamine, and Woodford)
 KY 1268 (Jessamine)
 KY 1269 (Bath)
 KY 1270 (Calloway and Graves)
 KY 1271 (Lyon)
 KY 1272 (Caldwell and Lyon)
 KY 1273 (Boyle and Lincoln)
 KY 1274 (Menifee and Rowan)
 KY 1275 (Wayne)
 KY 1276 (Graves)
 KY 1277 (Whitley)
 KY 1278 (Breathitt)
 KY 1279 (Ballard)
 KY 1280 (Ballard)
 KY 1281 (Clinton)
 KY 1282 (Fulton)
 KY 1283 (Graves and Hickman)
 KY 1284 (Harrison)
 KY 1285 (Nicholas)
 KY 1286 (McCracken)
 KY 1287 (Owen)
 KY 1288 (McCracken)
 KY 1289 (Bracken)
 KY 1290 (Ballard)
 KY 1291 (Anderson)
 KY 1292 (Boone)
 KY 1293 (Logan)
 KY 1294 (Hopkins)
 KY 1295 (Garrard and Madison)
 KY 1296 (Christian)
 KY 1297 (Barren and Warren)
 KY 1298 (Harrison and Nicholas)
 KY 1299 (Henderson)

1300–1399
 KY 1300 (Hickman)
 KY 1301 (Hickman)
 KY 1302 (Hopkins)
 KY 1303 (Kenton)
 KY 1304 (Knox)
 KY 1305 (Laurel)
 KY 1306 (Lewis)
 KY 1307 (Barren)
 KY 1308 (Logan)
 KY 1309 (Logan and Todd)
 KY 1310 (McCracken)
 KY 1311 (Marshall)
 KY 1312 (Cumberland)
 KY 1313 (Adair)
 KY 1314 (Montgomery)
 KY 1315 (Oldham and Shelby)
 KY 1316 (Owen)
 KY 1317 (Pulaski)
 KY 1318 (Barren)
 KY 1319 (Bullitt and Spencer)
 KY 1320 (Warren)
 KY 1321 (McCracken)
 KY 1322 (McCracken)
 KY 1323 (Adair)
 KY 1324 (Barren and Monroe)
 KY 1325 (Bath and Fleming)
 KY 1326 (Rockcastle)
 KY 1327 (Calloway)
 KY 1328 (Butler)
 KY 1329 (Rockcastle)
 KY 1330 (Barren and Metcalfe)
 KY 1331 (Bath and Montgomery)
 KY 1332 (Allen)
 KY 1333 (Allen)
 KY 1334 (Boone, deleted 1987)
 KY 1335 (Trimble)
 KY 1336 (Fleming)
 KY 1337 (Hopkins)
 KY 1338 (Christian and Hopkins)
 KY 1339 (Barren and Edmonson)
 KY 1340 (Webster)
 KY 1341 (Cumberland, deleted 2020)
 KY 1342 (Barren)
 KY 1343 (Mercer)
 KY 1344 (Bell)
 KY 1345 (Ballard)
 KY 1346 (Calloway)
 KY 1347 (Fleming)
 KY 1348 (Christian)
 KY 1349 (Christian)
 KY 1350 (Clay and Owsley)
 KY 1351 (Clinton and Cumberland)
 KY 1352 (Edmonson)
 KY 1353 (Estill)
 KY 1354 (Fulton)
 KY 1355 (Garrard)
 KY 1356 (Grayson)
 KY 1357 (Hardin)
 KY 1358 (Hart, deleted 2003)
 KY 1359 (Henry)
 KY 1360 (Henry)
 KY 1361 (Henry)
 KY 1362 (Hickman)
 KY 1363 (McCreary)
 KY 1364 (Marshall)
 KY 1365 (Edmonson)
 KY 1366 (Monroe)
 KY 1367 (Ballard)
 KY 1368 (Ballard)
 KY 1369 (Lincoln)
 KY 1370 (Pike, deleted 1984)
 KY 1371 (Carlisle)
 KY 1372 (Carlisle)
 KY 1373 (Pike)
 KY 1374 (Graves)
 KY 1375 (Hardin)
 KY 1376 (Laurel)
 KY 1377 (Carlisle)
 KY 1378 (Morgan, deleted 1994)
 KY 1379 (Muhlenberg)
 KY 1380 (Muhlenberg)
 KY 1381 (Russell)
 KY 1382 (Graves)
 KY 1383 (Russell)
 KY 1384 (Pike)
 KY 1385 (Breckinridge)
 KY 1386 (Allen, deleted 1984)
 KY 1387 (Perry)
 KY 1388 (Breathitt)
 KY 1389 (Daviess and Hancock)
 KY 1390 (Graves)
 KY 1391 (Hardin and Hart)
 KY 1392 (Spencer)
 KY 1393 (Knott)
 KY 1394 (Laurel)
 KY 1395 (Lawrence)
 KY 1396 (Marshall)
 KY 1397 (Magoffin)
 KY 1398 (Estill, deleted 2018)
 KY 1399 (Shelby)

1400–1499
 KY 1400 (Taylor)
 KY 1401 (Breckinridge)
 KY 1402 (Warren)
 KY 1403 (Hancock)
 KY 1404 (Marion and Washington)
 KY 1405 (Webster)
 KY 1406 (Hancock)
 KY 1407 (Hardin)
 KY 1408 (Oldham and Shelby)
 KY 1409 (Johnson)
 KY 1410 (Knott and Letcher
 KY 1411 (Lee and Owsley)
 KY 1412 (McLean)
 KY 1413 (Marshall)
 KY 1414 (Ohio)
 KY 1415 (Magoffin)
 KY 1416 (Spencer)
 KY 1417 (Bullitt)
 KY 1418 (Knox and Whitley
 KY 1400 (Breathitt and Wolfe
 KY 1420 (McCracken)
 KY 1421 (Allen)
 KY 1422 (Marshall)
 KY 1423 (Casey, deleted 1998)
 KY 1424 (Cumberland)
 KY 1425 (Fayette)
 KY 1426 (Floyd and Pike)
 KY 1427 (Floyd)
 KY 1428 (Floyd and Johnson)
 KY 1429 (Calloway)
 KY 1430 (Nelson)
 KY 1431 (Jackson)
 KY 1432 (Daviess)
 KY 1433 (Livingston)
 KY 1434 (Simpson)
 KY 1435 (Butler and Warren
 KY 1436 (Livingston)
 KY 1437 (Magoffin)
 KY 1438 (McCracken)
 KY 1439 (Martin)
 KY 1440 (Perry)
 KY 1441 (Pike)
 KY 1442 (Bullitt)
 KY 1443 (Lewis and Mason)
 KY 1444 (Carter)
 KY 1445 (Marshall)
 KY 1446 (Monroe)
 KY 1447 (Jefferson)
 KY 1448 (Mason)
 KY 1449 (Mason)
 KY 1450 (Bullitt and Jefferson)
 KY 1451 (Caldwell)
 KY 1452 (Union)
 KY 1453 (Christian and Todd)
 KY 1454 (McCracken)
 KY 1455 (Nicholas)
 KY 1456 (Daviess)
 KY 1457 (Estill)
 KY 1458 (Boyd and Greenup)
 KY 1459 (Greenup)
 KY 1460 (Pike)
 KY 1461 (Fulton)
 KY 1462 (Marshall)
 KY 1463 (Fulton)
 KY 1464 (Green)
 KY 1465 (Carroll)
 KY 1466 (Logan)
 KY 1467 (Daviess, deleted 2011)
 KY 1468 (Butler)
 KY 1469 (Letcher and Pike
 KY 1470 (McCreary)
 KY 1471 (Magoffin)
 KY 1472 (Franklin and Shelby
 KY 1473 (Muhlenberg)
 KY 1474 (Owen, deleted 2012)
 KY 1475 (Hickman)
 KY 1476 (Robertson)
 KY 1477 (Marshall)
 KY 1478 (Barren, deleted 1992)
 KY 1479 (Wayne)
 KY 1480 (Webster, deleted 2009)
 KY 1481 (Whitley)
 KY 1482 (Clay and Leslie)
 KY 1483 (Calloway)
 KY 1484 (Marshall)
 KY 1485 (Graves)
 KY 1486 (Kenton)
KY 1486C (Kenton)
 KY 1487 (Knox)
 KY 1488 (Oldham and Trimble
 KY 1489 (Trigg)
 KY 1490 (Marshall)
 KY 1491 (Bell)
 KY 1492 (Carroll and Trimble)
 KY 1493 (Hickman, deleted 1996)
 KY 1494 (Bullitt)
 KY 1495 (Caldwell)
 KY 1496 (Carter and Lawrence)
 KY 1497 (Calloway)
 KY 1498 (Floyd and Knott
 KY 1499 (Pike)

1500–1599
 KY 1500 (Hardin and Meade)
 KY 1501 (Kenton)
 KY 1502 (Magoffin)
 KY 1503 (Owsley)
 KY 1504 (Robertson)
 KY 1505 (Rockcastle)
 KY 1506 (Pike)
 KY 1507 (Trigg)
 KY 1508 (Union)
 KY 1509 (Calloway)
 KY 1510 (Anderson)
 KY 1511 (Taylor)
 KY 1512 (Carter)
 KY 1513 (Daviess)
 KY 1514 (Daviess)
 KY 1515 (Fleming)
 KY 1516 (Knott)
 KY 1517 (LaRue)
 KY 1518 (Marshall)
 KY 1519 (Barren)
 KY 1520 (Metcalfe and Monroe)
 KY 1521 (Calloway, deleted 1985)
 KY 1522 (Marshall)
 KY 1523 (Marshall)
 KY 1524 (Clay)
 KY 1525 (Webster)
 KY 1526 (Bullitt)
 KY 1527 (Knox)
 KY 1528 (Marshall, deleted 1996)
 KY 1529 (Graves and Hickman)
 KY 1530 (Knox)
 KY 1531 (Bullitt, Jefferson, and Shelby)
 KY 1532 (Logan, deleted 1995)
 KY 1533 (Allen)
 KY 1534 (Bell)
 KY 1535 (Laurel)
 KY 1536 (Calloway)
 KY 1537 (Hart, deleted 1999)
 KY 1538 (Hardin)
 KY 1539 (Henderson)
 KY 1540 (Hickman)
 KY 1541 (Jessamine)
 KY 1542 (Johnson, deleted 1984)
 KY 1543 (Ohio)
 KY 1544 (Ohio)
 KY 1545 (Russell)
 KY 1546 (Wayne)
 KY 1547 (Casey)
 KY 1548 (Boone, deleted 2005)
 KY 1549 (LaRue)
 KY 1550 (Calloway)
 KY 1551 (Calloway)
 KY 1552 (Casey)
 KY 1553 (Clinton)
 KY 1554 (Daviess)
 KY 1555 (Carter and Elliott)
 KY 1556 (Harlan)
 KY 1557 (Henderson)
 KY 1558 (Marshall)
 KY 1559 (Johnson)
 KY 1560 (Grant)
 KY 1561 (Laurel)
 KY 1562 (Lincoln, deleted 2001)
 KY 1563 (Ballard and McCracken)
 KY 1564 (McCracken)
 KY 1565 (McCracken)
 KY 1566 (Campbell)
 KY 1567 (McCreary)
 KY 1568 (Wayne)
 KY 1569 (Menifee and Morgan)
 KY 1570 (Franklin)
 KY 1571 (Estill)
 KY 1572 (Hart)
 KY 1573 (Hart)
 KY 1574 (Henderson and Union)
 KY 1575 (Pulaski)
 KY 1576 (Clinton)
 KY 1577 (Pulaski)
 KY 1578 (Allen)
 KY 1579 (Anderson)
 KY 1580 (Pulaski)
 KY 1581 (Hopkins)
 KY 1582 (Casey, deleted 1998)
 KY 1583 (Ohio, deleted 2021)
 KY 1584 (Washington)
 KY 1585 (Trigg)
 KY 1586 (Washington)
 KY 1587 (McLean)
 KY 1588 (Logan)
 KY 1589 (McLean)
 KY 1590 (Clinton)
 KY 1591 (Carlisle)
 KY 1592 (Caldwell)
 KY 1593 (Magoffin)
 KY 1594 (Union)
 KY 1595 (Bell and Whitley)
 KY 1596 (Johnson)
 KY 1597 (Mason)
 KY 1598 (Union)
 KY 1599 (Bell)

1600–1699
 KY 1600 (Hardin and Meade)
 KY 1601 (Harlan)
 KY 1602 (Bath)
 KY 1603 (Caldwell)
 KY 1604 (Bullitt)
 KY 1605 (Hancock)
 KY 1606 (Henry)
 KY 1607 (LaRue)
 KY 1608 (Livingston)
 KY 1609 (McCreary)
 KY 1610 (Marshall)
 KY 1611 (Russell)
 KY 1612 (Carter and Elliott)
 KY 1613 (Christian, deleted 1990)
 KY 1614 (Johnson and Morgan)
 KY 1615 (Casey)
 KY 1616 (Breckinridge)
 KY 1617 (Madison and Rockcastle)
 KY 1618 (LaRue)
 KY 1619 (Wayne)
 KY 1620 (Carter and Elliott)
 KY 1621 (Elliott)
 KY 1622 (Hopkins)
 KY 1623 (Mercer)
 KY 1624 (Johnson)
 KY 1625 (Taylor)
 KY 1626 (Carter)
 KY 1627 (Caldwell)
 KY 1628 (Carlisle)
 KY 1629 (Knox)
 KY 1630 (Bell)
 KY 1631 (Jefferson)
 KY 1632 (Campbell)
 KY 1633 (Spencer)
 KY 1634 (Clinton, deleted 1986)
 KY 1635 (Magoffin)
 KY 1636 (Scott)
 KY 1637 (Union)
 KY 1638 (Meade)
 KY 1639 (Powell)
 KY 1640 (Casey)
 KY 1641 (Trigg; deleted by 1981)
 KY 1642 (Pulaski)
 KY 1643 (Pulaski)
 KY 1644 (Fulton)
 KY 1645 (Estill)
 KY 1646 (Hardin)
 KY 1647 (Garrard, deleted 2005)
 KY 1648 (Fulton)
 KY 1649 (Casey)
 KY 1650 (Rockcastle)
 KY 1651 (McCreary)
 KY 1652 (Fayette, deleted 1989)
 KY 1653 (Wolfe)
 KY 1654 (Boyd and Carter)
 KY 1655 (Grayson)
 KY 1656 (Hart)
 KY 1657 (Pendleton)
 KY 1658 (Nicholas)
 KY 1659 (Franklin and Woodford)
 KY 1660 (Calloway)
 KY 1661 (Carter)
 KY 1662 (Carter and Lewis)
 KY 1663 (Christian)
 KY 1664 (Pulaski)
 KY 1665 (Franklin)
 KY 1666 (Garrard, deleted 1997)
 KY 1667 (Shelby)
 KY 1668 (Crittenden)
 KY 1669 (Owen)
 KY 1670 (Owen)
 KY 1671 (Union, deleted 1991)
 KY 1672 (Webster)
 KY 1673 (McCreary and Whitley)
 KY 1674 (Pulaski)
 KY 1675 (Pulaski)
 KY 1676 (Casey and Pulaski)
 KY 1677 (Pulaski)
 KY 1678 (Bourbon and Clark)
 KY 1679 (Harlan)
 KY 1680 (Russell)
 KY 1681 (Fayette, Franklin, and Woodford)
 KY 1682 (Christian)
 KY 1683 (Fayette, deleted 1999)
 KY 1684 (Graves and McCracken)
 KY 1685 (Franklin and Woodford)
 KY 1686 (Graves and Hickman
 KY 1687 (Christian and Hopkins)
 KY 1688 (Franklin and Scott)
 KY 1689 (Franklin and Scott)
 KY 1690 (Lawrence)
 KY 1691 (Boone, deleted 1987)
 KY 1692 (Meade)
 KY 1693 (Menifee)
 KY 1694 (Jefferson and Oldham)
 KY 1695 (Powell)
 KY 1696 (deleted by 1980; probably in Jefferson)
 KY 1697 (Knott)
 KY 1698 (Hickman)
 KY 1699 (Jefferson, deleted 1997)

1700–1799
 KY 1700 (Hancock and Ohio)
 KY 1701 (Taylor)
 KY 1702 (Adair)
 KY 1703 (Jefferson)
 KY 1704 (Carter)
 KY 1705 (Estill)
 KY 1706 (Fulton)
 KY 1707 (Franklin)
 KY 1708 (Hickman)
 KY 1709 (Clay and Jackson)
 KY 1710 (Graves)
 KY 1711 (Greenup)
 KY 1712 (Marshall)
 KY 1713 (Marshall, deleted 2000)
 KY 1714 (Martin)
 KY 1715 (Lawrence and Morgan)
 KY 1716 (Christian)
 KY 1717 (Owsley)
 KY 1718 (Fulton)
 KY 1719 (Hickman, deleted 1987)
 KY 1720 (Wayne)
 KY 1721 (Pulaski)
 KY 1722 (Fleming and Rowan)
 KY 1723 (Fayette, deleted 2018)
 KY 1724 (Washington)
 KY 1725 (Greenup)
 KY 1726 (Meade)
 KY 1727 (Jefferson)
 KY 1728 (Hickman)
 KY 1729 (Adair and Russell)
 KY 1730 (Russell)
 KY 1731 (Hickman)
 KY 1732 (Kenton, deleted 2018)
 KY 1733 (Franklin, deleted 1993)
 KY 1734 (Magoffin)
 KY 1735 (Meade)
 KY 1736 (Meade)
 KY 1737 (Ohio)
 KY 1738 (Ohio)
 KY 1739 (Owen, deleted 2012)
 KY 1740 (Breckinridge)
 KY 1741 (Carlisle)
 KY 1742 (Adair and Casey)
 KY 1743 (Harrison)
 KY 1744 (Harrison)
 KY 1745 (Hickman)
 KY 1746 (Lee)
 KY 1747 (Jefferson)
 KY 1748 (Graves and Hickman)
 KY 1749 (Edmonson and Warren)
 KY 1750 (Floyd and Johnson)
 KY 1751 (Hopkins, deleted 1995)
 KY 1752 (Taylor)
 KY 1753 (Todd)
 KY 1754 (Nelson and Washington)
 KY 1755 (Hickman)
 KY 1756 (Wayne)
 KY 1757 (Hickman)
 KY 1758 (Pike)
 KY 1759 (Fulton)
 KY 1760 (Lawrence)
 KY 1761 (Owen)
 KY 1762 (Perry)
 KY 1763 (Graves, deleted 2002)
 KY 1764 (Carlisle, deleted 2001)
 KY 1765 (Wayne)
 KY 1766 (Magoffin)
 KY 1767 (Daviess)
 KY 1768 (Owsley)
 KY 1769 (Laurel)
 KY 1770 (Lincoln)
 KY 1771 (Harrison)
 KY 1772 (Carlisle and Hickman)
 KY 1773 (Carter)
 KY 1774 (Breathitt)
 KY 1775 (Clinton)
 KY 1776 (Breathitt, deleted 2019)
 KY 1777 (Grayson)
 KY 1778 (Lincoln)
 KY 1779 (Shelby)
 KY 1780 (Harlan and Leslie)
 KY 1781 (Lincoln)
 KY 1782 (Adair)
 KY 1783 (Boone, deleted 1987)
 KY 1784 (Franklin)
 KY 1785 (Logan and Todd)
 KY 1786 (Rockcastle)
 KY 1787 (Rockcastle)
 KY 1788 (Simpson, deleted 1990)
 KY 1789 (Pike)
 KY 1790 (Shelby)
 KY 1791 (Adair)
 KY 1792 (McLean)
 KY 1793 (Oldham)
 KY 1794 (LaRue)
 KY 1795 (Spencer)
 KY 1796 (Washington)
 KY 1797 (Rockcastle)
 KY 1798 (Taylor)
 KY 1799 (Taylor)

1800–1899
 KY 1800 (Graves)
 KY 1801 (Christian, deleted 2012)
 KY 1802 (Todd)
 KY 1803 (Knox and Laurel)
 KY 1804 (Whitley)
 KY 1805 (Boyle)
 KY 1806 (Graves)
 KY 1807 (Leslie)
 KY 1808 (Wayne)
 KY 1809 (Knox and Whitley)
 KY 1810 (Laurel)
 KY 1811 (Letcher)
 KY 1812 (Breathitt and Wolfe
 KY 1813 (Casey, deleted 1987)
 KY 1814 (Graves)
 KY 1815 (Hardin)
 KY 1816 (Meade)
 KY 1817 (Oldham)
 KY 1818 (Oldham)
 KY 1819 (Jefferson)
 KY 1820 (Carlisle and Graves)
 KY 1821 (Graves)
 KY 1822 (Boyle and Mercer)
 KY 1823 (Hardin)
 KY 1824 (Calloway and Marshall)
 KY 1825 (Hickman)
 KY 1826 (Hickman)
 KY 1827 (Edmonson and Hart)
 KY 1828 (Calloway)
 KY 1829 (Boone and Kenton)
 KY 1830 (Graves)
 KY 1831 (Daviess)
 KY 1832 (LaRue)
 KY 1833 (Perry)
 KY 1834 (Taylor)
 KY 1835 (Webster)
 KY 1836 (Calloway and Marshall)
 KY 1837 (Ballard and McCracken)
 KY 1838 (Trimble)
 KY 1839 (Graves)
 KY 1840 (Estill)
 KY 1841 (Graves)
 KY 1842 (Harrison)
 KY 1843 (Christian)
 KY 1844 (Meade)
 KY 1845 (Garrard)
 KY 1846 (Hart)
 KY 1847 (Hancock)
 KY 1848 (Shelby)
 KY 1849 (Jefferson)
 KY 1850 (Clay and Leslie)
 KY 1851 (Jefferson)
 KY 1852 (McCracken, deleted 2002)
 KY 1853 (Pendleton)
 KY 1854 (Hart)
 KY 1855 (Allen)
 KY 1856 (Boyle)
 KY 1857 (Caldwell)
 KY 1858 (Nelson)
 KY 1859 (Casey)
 KY 1860 (Monroe)
 KY 1861 (Henry)
 KY 1862 (Letcher)
 KY 1863 (Graves)
 KY 1864 (Graves)
 KY 1865 (Jefferson)
 KY 1866 (Hardin)
 KY 1867 (Johnson, deleted 1984)
 KY 1868 (Hardin)
 KY 1869 (Graves)
 KY 1870 (Russell)
 KY 1871 (Shelby)
 KY 1872 (Washington)
 KY 1873 (Nelson)
 KY 1874 (Scott)
 KY 1875 (Anderson)
 KY 1876 (Bourbon and Fayette)
 KY 1877 (Breathitt, deleted 1985)
 KY 1878 (Fayette)
 KY 1879 (Bourbon)
 KY 1880 (Cumberland)
 KY 1881 (Christian)
 KY 1882 (Hardin and Meade)
 KY 1883 (Owen)
 KY 1884 (Martin)
 KY 1885 (Simpson)
 KY 1886 (Estill)
 KY 1887 (McCracken)
 KY 1888 (Magoffin)
 KY 1889 (Livingston)
 KY 1890 (Graves)
 KY 1891 (Trigg)
 KY 1892 (Campbell)
 KY 1893 (Bourbon)
 KY 1894 (Boyle)
 KY 1895 (Fleming)
 KY 1896 (Boyle)
 KY 1897 (Marshall)
 KY 1898 (Whitley, deleted 1988)
 KY 1899 (Henry)

1900–1999
 KY 1900 (Franklin)
 KY 1901 (Crittenden)
 KY 1902 (Fleming)
 KY 1903 (Ohio)
 KY 1904 (Hardin)
 KY 1905 (Crittenden)
 KY 1906 (LaRue)
 KY 1907 (Fulton)
 KY 1908 (Fulton, deleted 1995)
 KY 1909 (Fulton)
 KY 1910 (Carter)
 KY 1911 (Hopkins, deleted 1992)
 KY 1912 (Jackson and Rockcastle)
 KY 1913 (Adair, Green, and Taylor)
 KY 1914 (Christian)
 KY 1915 (Boyle and Mercer)
 KY 1916 (Campbell and Kenton, deleted 1984)
 KY 1917 (Crittenden)
 KY 1918 (Calloway)
 KY 1919 (Meade)
 KY 1920 (Boyle, Mercer, and Washington)
 KY 1921 (Hardin)
 KY 1922 (Henry and Shelby
 KY 1923 (Clark and Fayette)
 KY 1924 (Clark)
 KY 1925 (Boone)
 KY 1926 (Harlan)
 KY 1937 (Clark and Fayette)
 KY 1928 (Fayette, deleted 2018)
 KY 1929 (Floyd)
 KY 1930 (Kenton)
 KY 1931 (Jefferson)
 KY 1932 (Jefferson)
 KY 1933 (Breathitt)
 KY 1934 (Jefferson)
 KY 1935 (Carlisle)
 KY 1936 (Campbell)
 KY 1937 (Boyd and Lawrence)
 KY 1938 (Owsley)
 KY 1939 (Bourbon and Fayette)
 KY 1940 (Bourbon and Harrison)
 KY 1941 (Boyle and Mercer)
 KY 1942 (Boone, Gallatin, and Grant)
 KY 1943 (Lyon)
 KY 1944 (Bath)
 KY 1945 (Boyd)
 KY 1946 (Gallatin, deleted 2010)
 KY 1947 (Carter)
 KY 1948 (Lincoln)
 KY 1949 (Graves and Marshall)
 KY 1950 (Menifee and Morgan)
 KY 1951 (Bracken)
 KY 1952 (Adair)
 KY 1953 (Wolfe)
 KY 1954 (McCracken)
 KY 1955 (Jackson and Rockcastle)
 KY 1956 (Laurel, Pulaski, and Rockcastle)
 KY 1957 (Hancock)
 KY 1958 (Clark)
 KY 1959 (Carter)
 KY 1960 (Clark)
 KY 1961 (Clark)
 KY 1962 (Fayette and Scott)
 KY 1963 (Fayette and Scott)
 KY 1964 (Woodford)
 KY 1965 (Woodford)
 KY 1966 (Fayette and Woodford)
 KY 1967 (Woodford)
 KY 1968 (Fayette)
 KY 1969 (Fayette)
 KY 1970 (Bourbon and Fayette)
 KY 1971 (Garrard)
 KY 1972 (Garrard)
 KY 1973 (Fayette and Scott)
 KY 1975 (Fayette)
 KY 1975 (Fayette)
 KY 1976 (Fayette)
 KY 1977 (Fayette)
 KY 1978 (Fayette)
 KY 1979 (Christian)
 KY 1980 (Jessamine)
 KY 1981 (Jessamine)
 KY 1982 (Owen)
 KY 1983 (Madison)
 KY 1984 (Madison)
 KY 1985 (Madison)
 KY 1986 (Madison)
 KY 1987 (Madison)
 KY 1988 (Madison)
 KY 1989 (Madison)
 KY 1990 (Montgomery, deleted 2000)
 KY 1991 (Montgomery)
 KY 1992 (Gallatin)
 KY 1993 (Grant)
 KY 1994 (Grant)
 KY 1995 (Grant)
 KY 1996 (Campbell)
 KY 1997 (Campbell)
 KY 1998 (Campbell)
 KY 1999 (Clay)

See also
List of primary state highways in Kentucky

References

External links
Kentucky Transportation Cabinet - Division of Planning

 1000
State1001